The Hôtel Mansencal in Toulouse, France, is a Renaissance hôtel particulier (palace) of the 16th century. It is a listed historical monument since 1925.

History
The Hotel Mansencal is a mansion located at 1 rue Espinasse, in the historic center of Toulouse. Constructed in the second quarter of the 16th century, between 1527 and 1547, for an important Toulouse parliamentarian, Jean de Mansencal, it was deeply altered in the following centuries. The façade on the garden in particular was mutilated by the destruction of three spans out of five.

Description
The street façade is pierced with rectangular windows with stone frames. The porte cochere, with its portal decorated with fluted pilasters, opens onto a courtyard formed by two buildings. The left wing consists of a staircase tower with a corner turret attached to it. This high tower of 30 meters has the shape of a regular square which nevertheless contains a circular staircase. The latter ends with a Corinthian pillar from which eight ribs support a cylindrical arch.
The façade on the garden was the most impressive of the hotel and, although it retains only two spans out of the five that had been built, it retains its 16th century Renaissance elevation.
The spans offer an example of superposition of orders on three levels, the pilasters actually develop in a traditional way: Doric, Ionic, Corinthian. The windows are inscribed in semicircular arches and have wide double-sided doorframes.

Pictures

See also 
 Renaissance architecture of Toulouse

Bibliography 
 Guy Ahlsell de Toulza, Louis Peyrusse, Bruno Tollon, Hôtels et Demeures de Toulouse et du Midi Toulousain, Daniel Briand éditeur, Drémil Lafage, 1997

References

Houses completed in the 16th century
Buildings and structures in Toulouse
Renaissance architecture in Toulouse
Hôtels particuliers in Toulouse